Ciuciuleni is a village in Hîncești District, Moldova.

Notable people
 Grigore Scafaru
 Valentina Sturza

References

Villages of Hîncești District